St. Vincent Bay was a cannery town on the South Coast of British Columbia, Canada, located on the northwest bank of Jervis Inlet near Hotham Sound, and just northeast of the Saltery Bay ferry terminal on the upper Sunshine Coast, and opposite the mouth of Sechelt Inlet. It was utilized as a log sort and booming ground.  It has now been transformed into a quarry for aggregate.

See also
List of canneries in British Columbia

References
BCGNIS listing "St. Vincent Bay" (locality)
Time Travelling - Coastal Canneries of BC website

South Coast of British Columbia
Company towns in Canada
Ghost towns in British Columbia
Sunshine Coast Regional District
Unincorporated settlements in British Columbia